Nhat Nam may refer to:
Nhất Nam (martial art), (from "One Vietnam" 一南)
Nhật Nam (region), Chinese Rinan Han commandery (日南)